This article is a list of viscountcies in the peerages of Britain and Ireland, including the England, the Scotland, the Ireland, the Great Britain and the Peerage of the United Kingdom, listed in order of creation, including extant, extinct and abeyant titles. A viscount is the fourth rank in the peerage of the United Kingdom, Great Britain, England, Scotland and Ireland. A relatively late introduction, holders of the title take precedence after earls and before barons.

The term "viscount" (vice-comes) was originally a judicial honorific, long used in Anglo-Norman England to refer to a county sheriff.  It was only turned into a noble title, with hereditary dignity, in England by Henry VI in 1440, following the similar transformation of that title in France.

The majority of viscountcies are held by peers with higher titles, such as duke, marquess or earl; this can come about for a number of reasons, including the title being created as a subsidiary title at the same time as the higher peerage, the holder being elevated at a later time to a higher peerage or through inheritance when one individual is the heir to two separate titles.

Viscounts were created in the peerages of England and Scotland until the Act of Union 1707, thereafter being created in the peerage of Great Britain. After the Acts of Union 1800 came into effect in 1801, all peerages were created in the Peerage of the United Kingdom. Viscounts in the Peerage of Ireland were created by English and British monarchs in their capacity as Lord or King of Ireland. Irish peers were not initially granted a seat in the House of Lords and so allowed the grantee to sit in the House of Commons. Viscounts of Ireland have precedence below peers of England, Scotland, and Great Britain of the same rank, and above peers of the United Kingdom of the same rank; but Irish peers created after 1801 yield to United Kingdom peers of earlier creation.

A number of Speakers of the House of Commons have been elevated to the peerage as viscounts. Of the nineteen Speakers between 1801 and 1983, eleven were made viscounts, five were made barons, one refused a peerage and two died in office (and their widows were created a viscountess and a baroness). The last such was George Thomas, 1st Viscount Tonypandy upon his retirement in 1983. Since then it has had become more common to grant life peerages to retiring Speakers.

Naming conventions
In British practice, the title of a viscount may be either a place name, a surname, or a combination thereof: examples include the Viscount Falmouth, the Viscount Hardinge and the Viscount Colville of Culross, respectively. An exception exists for Viscounts in the peerage of Scotland, who were traditionally styled "The Viscount of [X]", such as the Viscount of Arbuthnott. In practice, however, very few maintain this style, instead using the more common version "The Viscount [X]" in general parlance.

Courtesy viscountcies
Many extant viscountcies are used as courtesy titles; a specifically British custom is the heir apparent of an earl or marquess being referred to as a viscount, if the second most senior title held by the head of the family is a viscount. For example, the eldest son of the Earl Howe is Viscount Curzon, because this is the second most senior title held by the Earl. However, the son of a marquess or an earl can be referred to as a viscount when the title of viscount is not the second most senior if those above it share their name with the substantive title. For example, the second most senior title of the Marquess of Salisbury is the Earl of Salisbury, so his heir uses the lower title of Viscount Cranborne, to avoid any possible confusion caused by them both being referred to as Lord Salisbury. Sometimes the son of a peer can be referred to as a viscount even when he could use a more senior courtesy title which differs in name from the substantive title. Family tradition plays a role in this. For example, the eldest son of the Marquess of Londonderry is Viscount Castlereagh, even though the Marquess is also the Earl Vane.

Viscountcies

Viscountcies in the Peerage of England, 1440–1707

Viscountcies in the Peerage of Scotland, 1606–1707

Viscountcies in the Peerage of Great Britain, 1707–1801

Viscountcies in the Peerage of Ireland, c.1406–1816

Viscountcies in the Peerage of the United Kingdom, 1801–present

See also
British nobility
List of viscounts in the peerages of Britain and Ireland

Notes

References

External links
 Lists of extant, abeyant and extinct peerages of Great Britain and Ireland, from www.cracroftspeerage.co.uk

Lists of peerages of Britain and Ireland
Lists of nobility
Lists of British nobility